Scopoides is a genus of ground spiders that was first described by Norman I. Platnick in 1989.

Species
 it contains fifteen species:
Scopoides asceticus (Chamberlin, 1924) – Mexico
Scopoides bryantae (Platnick & Shadab, 1976) – USA, Mexico
Scopoides cambridgei (Gertsch & Davis, 1940) – USA, Mexico
Scopoides catharius (Chamberlin, 1922) (type) – USA
Scopoides gertschi (Platnick, 1978) – USA
Scopoides gyirongensis Hu, 2001 – China
Scopoides kastoni (Platnick & Shadab, 1976) – USA, Mexico
Scopoides naturalisticus (Chamberlin, 1924) – USA, Mexico
Scopoides nesiotes (Chamberlin, 1924) – USA, Mexico
Scopoides ochraceus (F. O. Pickard-Cambridge, 1899) – Mexico
Scopoides rostratus (Platnick & Shadab, 1976) – Mexico
Scopoides santiago (Platnick & Shadab, 1976) – Mexico
Scopoides tlacolula (Platnick & Shadab, 1976) – Mexico
Scopoides wanglangensis Yuan, Zhao & Zhang, 2019 – China
Scopoides xizangensis Hu, 2001 – China

References

Araneomorphae genera
Gnaphosidae
Spiders of Asia
Spiders of North America